Vișinată  is a Romanian alcoholic beverage produced from sour cherries (vișine in Romanian), sugar and alcohol. It is very flavorful and sweet, and most often home-made. As a consequence, there is no "official" recipe for it. Everybody tunes quantities and preparation methods to suit his own taste.

Vișinată is easy to make and is completely natural depending on the type of alcohol used. It is traditionally produced in small quantities, to suit a family's need.

The jar is filled halfway with sour cherries and an equal amount of sugar (by weight, not volume). The mix may be left to ferment for a few days, then the rest of the jar filled with țuica or vodka (which stops the fermentation process) and sealed. The jar is then left in a dark place at room temperature for about 100 days. Contents are rolled around occasionally during this period to encourage proper mixing, especially during fermentation. At the end, the cherries are filtered out, and the resulting sweet drink is the "vișinata".

The flavor is heavily dependent on the quality of the fruit.  Therefore, it is advisable to use only hand-picked, healthy, well ripened, fresh fruit, if possible organically grown, and avoid getting leaves, stems, or other debris into the jar. The maceration in alcohol will amplify any bad taste in the fruit, such as with fruit that started to rot, instead of hiding it. Wood or leaves will release an unpleasant tannin into the drink, which will soften with age.

Alternately, honey may be used instead of sugar. Few people do, however, since honey is more expensive, and depending on its type may not contribute in a positive way to the taste.

Some production methods involve the smashing of the sour cherries before putting them in the jar. Alternatively, the kernels can be removed and broken open before being added to the jar. The inner, soft part of the kernel adds an almond-like flavor to the drink. These processes add the risk that the resulting drink will not be clear, as filtering is more difficult.

Many people in Romania use single or double-distilled plum brandy (also homemade), which is not allowed to age instead of alimentary alcohol.

Aging the drink improves its taste - depending on the type of alcohol used, the initial drink may feel a little rough and burning. This rough sensation can be likened to that experienced whilst consuming carbonated drinks, hence "vișinata" is sometimes referred to by other cultures as "fizzy wine". 

The remaining sour cherries are an excellent ingredient for cakes and pies, if used soon after removal from the jar - they get wrinkled and lose flavour with time.

Notes and references 

Cherry liqueurs and spirits
Romanian spirits